Lyrical School (stylized as lyrical school) is a Japanese hip hop idol group.

The group was founded in October 2010 under the name Tengal6 (stylized as tengal6, pronounced tengyaru shikksu). On August 1, 2012, it was renamed Lyrical School.

Members 
 Minan (本多未南, Minami Honda; born on ) – joined in August 2013
 Sayo - Joined on February 12, 2023
 Tmrw - Joined on February 12, 2023
 Hana - Joined on February 12, 2023
 Mana - Joined on February 12, 2023
 Malik - Joined on February 12, 2023
 Ryuya - Joined on February 12, 2023
 Reina - Joined on February 12, 2023

Former members 
 Mariko (工藤まり仔, Mariko Kudō; born on ) – graduated on January 26, 2013
 Erika (知名えりか, Erika China; born on ) – first generation leader, graduated on June 30, 2013 
 Hina (小松ひな, Hina Komatsu; born on ) – join on March 17, 2013; graduated on December 13, 2015 
 Yumi (清水裕美, Hiromi Shimizu; born on ) – left in September 2016 
 Ayaka (大部彩夏, Ayaka Ōbu; born on ) – second generation leader; graduated on February 26, 2017
 Mei (芽依, Mei; born on ) – graduated on February 26, 2017
 Ami (細越麻未, Asami Hosogoe; born on ) – graduated on February 26, 2017
 Hime (持田妃華, Himeka Mochida; born on ) – joined in December 2015 – graduated on July 24, 2022
 Hinako – joined on April 18, 2017 – graduated on July 24, 2022
 Risano – joined on April 18, 2017 – graduated on July 24, 2022
 Yuu – joined on April 18, 2017 – graduated on July 24, 2022

Member timeline

Discography

Singles

EPs / mini albums

Albums

References

External links 
 
 
 
 

Musical groups established in 2010
Japanese girl groups
Japanese idol groups
2010 establishments in Japan